Demi Ucok is an Indonesian drama-comedy film released on January 3, 2013, written and directed by . The film is set against the cultural background of Batak, starring Geraldine Sianturi, Lina Marpaung, Saira Jihan and Sunny Soon.

The film received three nominations: "Best Film" at the 2012 Indonesian Film Festival, "Favorite Film" at the 2013 Indonesian Movie Awards, and "Movie of the Year" at the 2013 Yahoo! OMG Awards.

Cast
 Geraldine Sianturi as Gloria Sinaga
 Lina Marpaung as Mak Gondut
 Saira Jihan as Niki
 Sunny Soon as Acun

Awards and nominations

References

External links
 Demiapa.com
 Halaman Facebook Film Demi Ucok
 Akun Twitter Film Demi Ucok
 Akun Youtube Film Demi Ucok
 Akun Blogger Film Demi Ucok
 Akun MindTalk Film Demi Ucok

Indonesian comedy-drama films
2013 films